The 1996 Japanese motorcycle Grand Prix was the third round of the 1996 Grand Prix motorcycle racing season. It took place on 21 April 1996 at the Suzuka Circuit.

500 cc classification

250 cc classification

125 cc classification

References

Japanese motorcycle Grand Prix
Japanese
Motorcycle Grand Prix